Morhange is a commune in the Moselle department in Lorraine, in north-eastern France.

Morhange may also refer to:

Surname 
Many people share this surname, including:
 Charles-Valentin Alkan (originally Morhange), French composer and pianist
 Françoise Morhange, a French actress who starred in Le Voyage en douce

Other uses 
 Réseau Morhange ("Morhange network"), a French resistance group created in 1943.
 Battle of Morhange, in August 1914 during World War I, one of the Battle of the Frontiers.

See also